Gurkha Memorial Park was established in Dharan, Nepal, "to preserve the legacy of Brigade of Gurkhas in Dharan for posterity before it is forgotten and lost forever", as many Nepalese men, many of whom were residents of Dharan, joined the Brigade of Gurkhas.

References

Gurkhas
Tourist attractions in Nepal
Buildings and structures in Sunsari District